The Battle of Fellaoucene took place near Tlemcen on 20 April 1957 during the Algerian War of Independence.

The battle coincided with the 16th day of Ramadan, when 30,000 French colonial soldiers equipped with heavy weapons and supported by tanks, 30 reconnaissance planes and 12 helicopters were sent to encounter 330 mujahideen of the Algerian National Liberation Front armed with makeshift rifles. The FLN militants put up a strong resistance against the French colonial army. As a result of the battle, the Algerians heavily defeated the French colonial army which lost 500 to 700 soldiers killed, 400 seriously wounded and 1 aircraft shot down, while the Algerians only had 120 killed and 60 wounded. A few days later, the French army took revenge by bombarding the entire region of Fellaoucene and the Trara mountains from Nedroma to Ghazaouet with napalm bombs and transferring the population.

References 

Conflicts in 1957
Battles of the Algerian War
1957 in France
1957 in Algeria